The Capital Journal is a newspaper in Pierre, South Dakota, founded in 1881. It serves the South Dakota capital city of Pierre and the surrounding region, including Fort Pierre. As of December 2012, it reported a daily circulation of 10,750, with new issues published Monday through Friday (except Christmas Day and New Year's Day). It has been the official printed record of Hughes and Stanley counties in South Dakota since the year of its founding.

The paper was purchased by Sierra Vista, Arizona-based Wick Communications in 2005. The paper's publisher is Jeffrey Hartley. Grand Forks Herald columnist Marilyn Hagerty began her journalism career with the paper while still in high school.

References

External links
 

1881 establishments in Dakota Territory
Newspapers published in South Dakota
Pierre, South Dakota
Publications established in 1881
Wick Communications publications